The National College is a Mexican honorary academy with a strictly limited membership created by presidential decree in 1943 in order to bring together the country's foremost artists and scientists, who are periodically invited to deliver lectures and seminars in their respective area of speciality. Membership is generally a lifelong commitment, although it could be forfeited under certain conditions. It should not be confused with El Colegio de México, a public institution of higher education and research.

History
The college was founded on 8 April 1943. with the purpose of promoting Mexican culture and scholarship in a number of different fields. Its motto is "Libertad por saber" (Freedom through knowing) and its emblem is an eagle taking off (symbolizing freedom of thought) above a flaming sun (representing wisdom). The college's foundation decree, signed by General Manuel Ávila Camacho, limited membership to twenty Mexican-born citizens, who were supposed to deliver their lectures and or seminars in its official premises at Mexico City. A subsequent amendment signed by President Luis Echeverría in 1971 increased the limit to forty and members were given the choice of delivering both their lectures or seminars in places other than the capital. Those aged 70 and over were released, at their discretion, from that obligation. Naturalized Mexicans can also been appointed, provided that at least ten years had passed since they acquired citizenship.

In 1995, President Ernesto Zedillo amended the rules so that naturalized Mexicans could be admitted to the college irrespective of the date on which they acquired citizenship.

Building
The property on which the Colegio sits used to belong to the Convent of La Enseñanza. When the convent was closed in 1863, due to the Reform Laws, this site first became the Palace of Justice. Later, the property was split to house the General Notary Archives and the Colegio. The building took on its present appearance in 1871. During the presidency of Lázaro Cárdenas, the building was used by the Unified Socialist Youth Movement.

The main access to the building is from Luis Gonzalez Obregon Street, between Rep. de Argentina and Rep. de Brazil Streets. This used to be the back entrance to the convent. The facade of the building has three levels and is covered in tezontle, a blood-red, porous, volcanic stone. The doors, windows and balconies are framed in chiluca, a greyish-white stone. The windows and balconies have ironwork railings and window guards. The main entrance leads to an entrance hall, which leads to a central patio. The ground floor of the patio is marked with pilasters while the upper level has columns. The main room in the building is the assembly hall, where debates take place, new members are initiated and congresses in the college's various specialities are conducted.

The building houses a collection of nine gilded altarpieces that date from the end of the 17th century, with the largest of these dedicated to the Our Lady of the Pillar. Among the paintings on display are "The Assumption of Mary" and "The Virgin of the Book of Revelation Apocalypse", both done by Andres Lopez in 1779.

Members
The first date is the admission date to The National College; the second is the date of death or resignation/expulsion.

Founders
Alfonso Reyes, writer and diplomat
Diego Rivera, painter and muralist
José Vasconcelos, writer and philosopher
José Clemente Orozco, painter and muralist
Enrique González Martínez, poet and diplomat
Ezequiel A. Chávez,
Antonio Caso, philosopher
Ignacio Chávez, cardiologist
Isaac Ochoterena
Manuel Uribe y Troncoso, ophthalmologist
Carlos Chávez, composer
Mariano Azuela, novelist of the Mexican Revolution
Manuel Sandoval Vallarta, MIT cosmic ray physicist, former mentor of Richard Feynman and Julius Stratton.
Alfonso Caso, archaeologist
Ezequiel Ordóñez

Members admitted in the 20th century
Ignacio González Guzmán (22 November 1943; † 2 December 1946) Haemotology and cytology
Manuel Toussaint (21 January 1946; † 2 December 1946) Art history and criticism
Silvio Zavala (6 January 1947) History
Arturo Rosenblueth (6 October 1947; † 20 September 1970) Physiology
Antonio Castro Leal (9 August 1948; † 7 January 1981) Humanities
Jesús Silva Herzog (16 November 1948; † 13 March 1985) Economics
Gerardo Murillo "Dr. Atl" (6 November 1950; resigned 7 May 1951) Painting
Daniel Cosío Villegas (2 April 1951; † 10 March 1976) History
Samuel Ramos (8 July 1952; † 20 June 1959) Philosophy
Agustín Yáñez (8 July 1952; † 17 January 1980) Literature
Guillermo Haro (6 July 1953; † 27 April 1988) Astronomy
Jaime Torres Bodet (6 July 1953; † 15 May 1974) Poetry and literary criticism
Manuel Martínez Báez (7 March 1955; † 19 January 1987) Preventive medicine
Eduardo García Máynez (4 November 1957; † 2 September 1993) Philosophy of law
José Adem (4 April 1960; † 14 February 1991) Mathematics
José Villagrán García (4 April 1960; † 10 June 1982) Architecture
Antonio Gómez Robledo (7 October 1960; † 3 October 1994) Law and philosophy
Victor L. Urquidi (18 October 1960; resigned 1 January 1968) Economics
Octavio Paz (1 August 1967; † 19 April 1998) Poetry and literature, recipient of the 1995 Nobel Prize in Literature.
Miguel León-Portilla (23 March 1971) Ancient Mexican history
Ignacio Bernal (4 April 1972; † 24 January 1992) Anthropology
Rubén Bonifaz Nuño (4 April 1972) Poetry and literature
Antonio Carrillo Flores (4 April 1972; † 20 March 1987) Law
Ramón de la Fuente (4 April 1972; † 31 March 2006) Psychiatrist; chaired the National Academy of Medicine, served as vice-president of World Psychiatric Association and founded the Mexican Institute of Psychiatry.
Carlos Fuentes (4 April 1972; † 15 May 2012) Novels and literature
Alfonso García Robles (4 April 1972; † 2 September 1991) International law
Marcos Moshinsky (4 April 1972) Theoretical physicist; winner of the UNESCO Science Prize.
Jesús Romo Armeria (4 April 1972; † 14 May 1977) Applied chemistry
Emilio Rosenblueth (4 April 1972; † 11 January 1994) Seismic engineering
Fernando Salmerón (4 April 1972) Philosophy
Ramón Xirau (1 October 1973) Philosophy
Julián Adem (23 October 1974) Geophysics
Carlos Casas Campillo (23 October 1974; † 6 October 1994) Microbiology
Héctor Fix-Zamudio (23 October 1974) Legal procedure and comparative law
Jesús Kumate (23 October 1974) Immunology
Jaime García Terrés (23 October 1974; † 29 April 1996) Poetry and literature
Bernardo Sepúlveda Gutiérrez (24 October 1975; † 17 March 1985) Gastroenterology
Leopoldo Solís (13 October 1976) Economics
Leopoldo García-Colín (12 September 1977) Physicist; winner of the 1988 National Prize for Arts and Sciences and former chair of the Mexican Society of Physics (1972-1973).
Luis González y González (8 November 1978) History of Mexico
Luis Villoro (14 November 1978) Philosophy
Ruy Pérez Tamayo (27 November 1980) Pathology
Salvador Elizondo (28 April 1981; † 29 March 2006) Literature and literary criticism
Antonio Alatorre (26 June 1981) Philology
Guillermo Soberón Acevedo (5 November 1981) Biochemistry and higher education
Gustavo Cabrera (19 November 1981) demographer; winner of the 1981 National Prize for Demography.
Marcos Mazari Menzer (11 November 1982) Nuclear physics
Eduardo Mata (9 August 1984;  † 4 January 1995) Music
Gabriel Zaid (26 September 1984) Poetry and literature
Beatriz de la Fuente (7 May 1985) Art history
Adolfo Martínez Palomo (6 June 1985) Pathology and cellular biology
José Emilio Pacheco (9 October 1986) Novels and literature
Samuel Gitler Hammer (9 October 1986; † 9 September 2014) Mathematics
José Sarukhán Kérmez (26 June 1987) Biology
Arcadio Poveda Ricalde (1 March 1989) Astronomy
Teodoro González de León (28 October 1989) Architecture
Rufino Tamayo (21 May 1991; † 24 June 1991) Painting
Pablo Rudomín (25 February 1993) Physiology
Manuel Peimbert (24 May 1993) Astronomy
Eduardo Matos Moctezuma (24 June 1993) Archaeology
Donato Alarcón Segovia (9 November 1994) Medicine
Vicente Rojo (16 November 1994) artist; recipient of the National Prize for Arts and Sciences.
Francisco Bolívar Zapata (8 December 1994) Biotechnology
Octavio Novaro (27 October 1995) theoretical physicist; winner of the 1993 UNESCO Science Prize.
Fernando del Paso (12 February 1996) Literature
Alejandro Rossi (22 February 1996) Philosophy
Mario Lavista (14 October 1998) Music
Luis Felipe Rodríguez Jorge (24 February 2000), radioastronomer, discoverer of double-sided radio jets from the galactic sources 1E1740.7-2942 and GRS 1758-258 and superluminal motion of radio knots in the galactic source GRS 1915+105. Winner of the 1996 Bruno Rossi Prize of the American Astronomical Society and the Mexican National Prize of Science.

Members admitted in the 21st century
Mario J. Molina (24 April 2003), co-recipient of the 1995 Nobel Prize in Chemistry for elucidating the threat to the Earth's ozone layer by chlorofluorocarbon gases (CFCs).
Enrique Krauze (27 April 2005), historian and cultural promoter, member of the board of Instituto Cervantes and the Mexican Academy of History.
Eusebio Juaristi (13 February 2006), researcher on Physical chemistry, winner of the 1998 National Prize of Arts and Sciences.
María Elena Medina-Mora Icaza (6 April 2006), researcher at the National Institute of Psychiatry, winner of the 1986 Gerardo Varela National Prize of Public Health.
Diego Valadés (13 February 2007), former Attorney General and researcher at the National Autonomous University of Mexico (UNAM).
Luis Fernando Lara (5 March 2007), linguist, member of UNESCO's Permanent International Committee of Linguists.
Linda Rosa Manzanilla (9 April 2007), archaeologist specialized in domestic archaeology in early urban developments, first Mexican woman ever admitted to the United States National Academy of Sciences.
Ranulfo Romo (9 March 2011), neuroscientist and researcher at the National Autonomous University of Mexico (UNAM).
Jaime Urrutia Fucugauchi (4 February 2014), geophysicist, president of the Mexican Academy of Sciences, and researcher at the National Autonomous University of Mexico (UNAM).
José Ramón Cossío Díaz (11 February 2014), lawyer and jurist, member of the Supreme Court of the Nation.
Juan Villoro, (24 February 2014), author.
Antonio Lazcano (6 October 2014), biologist specialized in the origins of life. Professor at the National Autonomous University of Mexico (UNAM).
Alejandro Frank Hoeflich (31 March 2016), physicist and researcher at the National Autonomous University of Mexico (UNAM).
Julia Carabias Lillo (27 August 2018), biologist and environmental conservationist.
Leonardo López Luján (15 March 2019), archaeologist and director of the Templo Mayor Project (INAH).

References

External links

Arts organizations based in Mexico
Scientific organizations based in Mexico
Learned societies of Mexico
Organizations based in Mexico City
Educational institutions established in 1943
1943 establishments in Mexico
Buildings and structures in Mexico City
Historic center of Mexico City